The 1963 Detroit Tigers season was a season in American baseball. The team finished tied for fifth place in the American League with a record of 79–83, 25½ games behind the New York Yankees.

Offseason 
 November 26, 1962: 1962 first-year draft
Tom Matchick was drafted by the Tigers from the St. Louis Cardinals.
Rich Reese was drafted from the Tigers by the Minnesota Twins.
Conrad Cardinal was drafted from the Tigers by the Houston Colt .45s.
 November 26, 1962: Dick Brown was traded by the Tigers to the Baltimore Orioles for Whitey Herzog and Gus Triandos.

Regular season

Season standings

Record vs. opponents

Notable transactions 
 April 8, 1963: Denny McLain was selected off waivers by the Tigers from the Chicago White Sox as first-year waiver pick.
 May 8, 1963: Chico Fernández was traded by the Tigers to the Milwaukee Braves for Lou Johnson and cash.

Roster

Player stats

Batting

Starters by position 
Note: Pos = Position; G = Games played; AB = At bats; H = Hits; Avg. = Batting average; HR = Home runs; RBI = Runs batted in

Other batters 
Note: G = Games played; AB = At bats; H = Hits; Avg. = Batting average; HR = Home runs; RBI = Runs batted in

Pitching

Starting pitchers 
Note: G = Games pitched; IP = Innings pitched; W = Wins; L = Losses; ERA = Earned run average; SO = Strikeouts

Other pitchers 
Note: G = Games pitched; IP = Innings pitched; W = Wins; L = Losses; ERA = Earned run average; SO = Strikeouts

Relief pitchers 
Note: G = Games pitched; W = Wins; L = Losses; SV = Saves; ERA = Earned run average; SO = Strikeouts

Farm system 

LEAGUE CHAMPIONS: Thomasville

Notes

References 

1963 Detroit Tigers season at Baseball Reference

Detroit Tigers seasons
Detroit Tigers season
Detroit Tigers
1963 in Detroit